Mark Lamarr (born Mark Jones, 7 January 1967) is an English comedian, writer, radio DJ, and television presenter. He was a team captain on Shooting Stars from 1995 to 1997, and hosted Never Mind the Buzzcocks from 1996 to 2005.

Early life
 
Lamarr was born in the Park South area of Swindon, Wiltshire. He has three elder sisters. His father is Irish. He passed five O-Levels at Park School (renamed Oakfield School) but dropped out of school at 17 and moved to Harrow, London, which was the centre of the early 1980s British rockabilly revival scene. After his poem Too Fast to Live, Too Young to Work was published in 1987, his act developed from poetry to stand-up comedy. He took to performing at London's Comedy Store in 1985, was spotted on the touring circuit for the launch of Channel 4's The Big Breakfast in 1992 and co-presented The Word.

Career

Television
Lamarr first came to the public's attention as a co-presenter of the early 1990s late night variety show The Word. The magazine format of the series allowed for interviews, live music, features and even game shows. The flexible late-night format meant that guests could do just about anything to be controversial. Talking about his TV career to Jo Brown of Cheers Magazine, Lamarr said The Word was:

After leaving The Word, Lamarr was an outside presenter on The Big Breakfast from 1992 to 1996. Between 1995 and 1997 he appeared as a team captain in the surreal panel show Shooting Stars, where he displayed a mixture of dour boredom and contempt towards hosts Vic Reeves and Bob Mortimer who, in turn, mocked his "50s throw-back" appearance. Lamarr declined to return for the fourth series in 2002, claiming he did not want to be typecast for appearing on panel shows. He said of his experience on the show:

Lamarr was host of Never Mind the Buzzcocks when the show launched in 1996 and continued in this role for 17 series until 2005. Under Lamarr, the show gained a reputation for scornful treatment of the boy bands and the pop music that had dominated the music scene since the early 1990s, a position that was maintained by his successor. Although Lamarr initially intended to return to Buzzcocks after one series away, although Lamarr has since confirmed with a Twitter post during 2022 that he said that so he wouldn’t be questioned about him quitting the show  he was ultimately replaced by Simon Amstell from the 19th series.

The second series of the sitcom 15 Storeys High was co-written by Lamarr with comedians Sean Lock and Martin Trenaman, although Lamarr was credited under his original name, Mark Jones. Lamarr made a cameo appearance in the fourth episode of series two.

Radio
Lamarr has previously presented shows on BBC GLR, BBC Radio 5 and BBC Radio 1. He also often guest presented the late night BBC Radio 2 show, sitting in for Mark Radcliffe.

On 20 July 1998, Lamarr launched a new show on BBC Radio 2 called Shake, Rattle and Roll, where he played tracks from his own sizeable record collection of obscure rock and roll gems. He also presented The Reggae Show series and Mark Lamarr's Alternative Sixties, playing lesser known tracks from the 1960s.

On 22 April 2006, Lamarr started a new Radio 2 show called God's Jukebox. The show aired from midnight to 3.00am on Saturdays and featured a wide variety of music from the previous 70 years including soul, ska, reggae, country, gospel and rap. He also, with Jo Brand, regularly covered the Jonathan Ross Saturday morning show on Radio 2 when Ross was away. His final God's Jukebox show was broadcast on Christmas Eve/Day, 2010. At the end of 2010 Lamarr left Radio 2, claiming the station had lost interest in non-mainstream music. In a 2013 interview with music website “Famous Last Words”, Lamarr stated that he would return to radio in the future. 

Lamarr presented a music show for British Airways on-board listeners as part of their in-flight entertainment. In this show he presented a mix of rock and roll, blues, reggae, soul and R&B.

Post-radio career
Lamarr has continued to produce various compilation albums for several record labels, with an emphasis on lesser-known rock 'n' roll tracks. He produced a compilation for Vee-Tone Records in 2015. Lamarr joined Twitter in 2018 and uses the platform to showcase lesser known music. 

Lamarr made a return to comedy in September 2020, appearing in an episode of the BBC Radio 4 sitcom Phil Ellis Is Trying as the voice of Billy Bonker, the reclusive owner of a Cup-a-Soup factory.

Stand-up videos
 Uncensored And Live (17 November 1997)

Personal life
On 1 September 2018, the Metropolitan Police charged Lamarr with common assault and false imprisonment. He was due to appear at Uxbridge Magistrates' Court on 2 October 2018 to face the charges, but on 1 October 2018 the case was discontinued, with the Crown Prosecution Service confirming "there was insufficient evidence to provide a realistic prospect of conviction". On 22 March 2019, Lamarr received an apology from the Crown Prosecution Service about the discontinued case, where it was observed that "the prosecutor who authorised the charges... did so in error".

References

External links

1967 births
Living people
British radio DJs
BBC Radio 2 presenters
English game show hosts
English male comedians
English radio DJs
English television presenters
People from Swindon
Television personalities from Wiltshire
English people of Irish descent